Ali-Kabir Takmilinejad, better known as Farzin, was an Iranian pop singer in the 1970s.

Biography
Farzin was a singer before the revolution of 1979. Farzin's first song was called "Mehman" (Persian: مهمان), written by Bijan Ghaderi. He was named 'Demis Roussos' of Iran.
Before 1979 revolution Farzin worked with Aref in 'Sati Nik'. Sati Nik was Farzin and Aref hangout lovers. From that time musics, we can pointed to 'Dam Begirim' (Persian: دم بگیریم) at that time, it became famous. Farzin left Iran and immigrated to the U.S.A. after 8 years silence in artwork in Iran and then He released his first album called "Gerye Nakon" (Persian: گریه نکن).
He left the Los Angeles artwork and immigrated to Germany for some reason.
Farzin has two children, Arash and Atie.

Death
The main cause of his death was heart attack. He had breathing problems before his death.

Albums
Gerye Nakon (1993)
Mashogh (1992)
Eshgh (1990)
Bi Rokhe To
Sedaye Khaste
Agar Sokhtim
Zeyno
Ashk (1999)
Khoda Hafez (1996)
Be Yade Diroz
Rahe Iran (1998)

References
Iran Song - Farzin

People from Abadan, Iran
1952 births
1999 deaths
Iranian male singers
Iranian expatriates in Germany
20th-century Iranian male singers